Veliki Brat 2015, also known as Veliki Brat 5 is the fifth season of the television reality show Veliki Brat, the Serbian, Bosnian, Montenegrin and Macedonian joint version of Big Brother. This season is the fifth season of the show in Serbia and seventh overall in Croatia - for both a first season after the show went on a two-year hiatus. The show is broadcast by RTL for Croatia, B92 and Prva TV for Serbia, OBN and BN for Bosnia & Herzegovina, Sitel for Macedonia and Prva for Montenegro.

Veliki Brat 5 was originally planned for fall 2013, but producers decided to cancel, and said that they would instead to do one in early 2014. Later on, in spring 2014, they said they plan to push it to fall 2014, or even spring 2015. On 12 October 2014, it was announced that the season will not be aired, because the house was demolished. However, this news was fake, since Slovenia used that house earlier in 2015 for their season. It was later revealed that Veliki Brat would start on September 4, with Antonija Blaće and Sky Wikluh (who previously participated in Veliki Brat VIP 2) as the hosts.

The Final took place on 12 December. This is the first season won by a Macedonian housemate.

Housemates 
Fourteen housemates entered the show on Day 1. On Day 2, Anton, Luka and Ivona entered the house. On Day 22, Mirjana and Vesna entered the house. On Day 50, Dorde and Jozefina entered the house.

Nominations table

Notes

References

External links 

2015 Serbian television seasons
2015